John Purling  (c. 1722–1800) was an East India Company commander and director and a politician who sat in the House of Commons between 1770 and 1790.

Purling's  parentage  is unknown but he may been a native of St Helena. Mr or Captain John Purling was allowed by the East India Company to travel there in 1750 at his own expense. He entered the Company's shipping service  and was commander of the Indiaman Sandwich from 1753 to 1759, and Neptune from 1760 to 1762. Following his last highly profitable China voyage. he resigned the service, and in April 1763 was elected a director of the Company.

In 1770, Purling became Deputy Chairman of the East India Company and purchased the estate of Bradford Peverell in Dorset. Also in 1770 he stood in a by-election at New Shoreham in opposition to two other members of the East Indian Company, Thomas Rumbold and William James. Although Purling came second on the poll he was declared elected Member of Parliament by the returning officer who was concerned at the level of bribery and corruption by other candidates. However he was unseated on petition. In 1771 he became Chairman of the East India Company. In a by-election in 1772 he was returned unopposed as MP for East Looe on the interest of John Buller senior. In 1772 the East India Company ran into financial difficulties, and Purling as its chairman was criticized for misleading the proprietors about their position. Although the control of the Company's affairs really rested with Sulivan and Sir George Colebrook and Purling's responsibility was largely nominal, he refused to stand for re-election as Chairman in 1773. In a speech in Parliament on 23 March 1773, he welcomed parliamentary investigation into the Company's affairs. In 1774 he took the lead in pressing for the compensation of East India commanders adversely affected by the shipping reforms resulting from the Regulating Act of 1773. In 1774 he was returned unopposed for Weymouth and Melcombe Regis. He became a director of the EIC again in 1777 and remained until 1780. In 1780 he was returned for Weymouth unopposed. He was a member of  the St. Alban's Tavern group, which tried to bring about a union between Pitt and Fox. He was returned unopposed for Weymouth again in 1784 but did not stand in 1790.

Purling died on 23 August 1800, aged 78.  His will mentions property near Weymouth and Ramsay in Huntingdonshire, and also at St. Vincent in the West Indies  He built up a large collection of works of art by Raphael, Correggio, Carracci, Guido, Parmegiano, Claude Titian, Tintoretto, S. Ricci, Domenichino, P. Veronese, P. Da Cortona, C. Maratti, Poussin, Murillo, Cuyp, Rubens, Teniers, Zuccarelli, Wilson, Wouvermans, P. Potter, Vanderwerff, Vandervelde, Berchem, Ferg and others. These were auctioned in 1801 after his death.<ref>A Catalogue of the Renowned and Valuable Collection of Pictures of John Purling Esq</ref]</ref>

References

1720s births
1800 deaths
Directors of the British East India Company
British MPs 1768–1774
British MPs 1774–1780
British MPs 1780–1784
British MPs 1784–1790
Members of the Parliament of Great Britain for English constituencies